Douglas Thomson may refer to:

 Dougie Thomson (born 1951), Scottish bass guitarist, formerly of the progressive rock band Supertramp
 Sir Douglas Thomson, 2nd Baronet (1905–1972), Scottish Unionist politician, Member of Parliament 1935–1946
 Doug Thomson (footballer) (1896–1959), Australian rules footballer
 Douglas Thomson (footballer) (born 1891), Scottish footballer

See also
Doug Thompson, mayor